Flavobacterium buctense is a Gram-negative and aerobic bacterium from the genus of Flavobacterium which has been isolated from water from the Chishui River from Guizhou in China.

References

 

buctense
Bacteria described in 2016